So Long Ago the Garden is an album recorded by Larry Norman, released in 1973. It is the second album in what came to be known as his "trilogy," which began with the album Only Visiting This Planet and concluded with In Another Land. So Long Ago the Garden was controversial because Norman's previously blatant Christian beliefs were more veiled on this album.  In the song "Shot Down", on the album In Another Land, Norman responded to accusations by fellow Christians that he had abandoned his faith in search of fame and fortune.

History
On August 7, 1973, Norman entered AIR studios in London to record his favorite album, the second album in his Trilogy, So Long Ago the Garden which was produced by The Triumvirate of British producers Rod Edwards, Roger Hand, Jon Miller. According to John J. Thompson, "lyrically, as the title suggests, the album reflects on the nature of the human condition. The songs deal with characters ... knee deep in the madness of life without God". In a 1980 interview, Norman explained the purpose of So Long Ago the Garden:
It is my favourite album, and one of the most banned and misunderstood albums that I've recorded. Christians don't seem to be as aware of, or as sensitive to, the dire state of humanity as they are about the pleasant growth of their Christian walk. So Long Ago The Garden was as definitive a statement as I could make about the emptiness of our lives without Christ, just how lonely and wretched we truly are. I alternated songs. One song would talk about a man trying to find satisfaction and true love, and expecting a woman to somehow fill all of his needs and be his whole world. The next song would be Lonely By Myself. Strictly about a man looking for something, and he doesn't know what it is. We know it's God, and he knows it's something like great universal love, but he can't find it, and it causes him Ecclesiastical despair. Then Be Careful What You Sign, making that choice between God or Satan, and the song after that was making a choice between your own integrity, or giving up your integrity for things like love, whatever momentary, ephemeral things that we look to for lasting happiness. So it was all a very premeditated and carefully written album.

By October 1, 1973 these recording sessions were completed and the recordings were submitted to MGM. However, financial problems at MGM, which would result in its collapse within fifteen months, "couldn't adequately promote or advertise the album. The corporate attention was focused on more pressing things like survival and solvency". According to Norman, the record company dropped several Christian songs, including "Butterfly," "If God Is My Father," "Kulderachna", and "I Hope I'll See You In Heaven", in favor of more lightweight love songs like "Fly, Fly, Fly" and "Christmastime', both previously released as singles. Norman discussed this matter in 1991:
The record company, obviously, was more concerned with commerce than art. They wanted "Fly, Fly, Fly" and "Christmastime" on the album. These songs were B-Sides, recorded for singles. I was of the old school from where the Beatles had come, believing that singles should be recorded for single release and that albums should not contain the singles but be works of art, separate unto themselves. I tried to keep the polished "commercial" singles separate from the artistic music made for the album, as I intended with "I Love You" during my days at Capitol Records. It was disappointing to me when the music was mixed together in the same format.

When Norman reissued the album in 1980 (with a modified track list), he retitled the album Almost...So Long Ago the Garden and the MGM Singles. As part of a Compleat Trilogy series, in 2008 Solid Rock released a version of this album that restored two of the withheld songs. Each of the four affected songs has been released on other albums. "If God Is My Father" can be found on Larry Norman (1977) "Kulderachna" and "Butterfly" were released on Instigator - The Essential, Volume 1 (2003) and "I Hope I'll See You In Heaven" can be found on Down Under (But Not Out) (1986).</ref>

The release of So Long Ago the Garden in November 1973 caused controversy in the Christian press primarily due to its album cover, which some insisted featured a naked Norman, and that this was proof he had fallen away from God. As John J. Thompson explains: "The cover featured a seminude Norman with a photo of a lion superimposed on his skin. The symbolism (an Old Testament prophecy referred to the Messiah as 'the lion of the tribe of Judah,' and C.S. Lewis' Narnia series made a Christlike figure out of a lion named Aslan, as well as the obvious insinuation of Adam in the Garden of Eden, flew over the heads of many people, who focused on a patch of grass covering Larry's nether parts". 
Steve Turner adds: "The songs which examined the fall were mostly written from the perspective of the scarred and his public just could not  take the idea of an artist taking another persona to make a point. To them he was a backslider who had broken with his wife and was seeking fame (the ideas being taken from his songs)". Turner indicated that Bible bookstores, especially in the southern and midwestern States of the USA, refused to sell his albums, and that all of his concerts were canceled until Noel Paul Stookey invited him onstage during one of his concerts eighteen months later.

However, believing that MGM was interfering with the subject matter of his records, by 1974 Norman left MGM due to "a squabble with MGM over song choices for his next album, ..."In Another Land". Not long after this decision, MGM Records folded due to economic difficulties.

A version of the song "Christmas Time" originally appeared on the rare album Born Twice, by Norman's friend Randy Stonehill, which Norman had produced in 1969.  On that LP, the song is credited as having been written by Stonehill, but the original release of So Long Ago the Garden credits Norman and Stonehill as co-authors. The later Phydeaux re-release only credits Norman.

"Lonely By Myself" was recorded using the same mellotron The Beatles used on "Strawberry Fields Forever" while Paul McCartney was in the next room recording "Live and Let Die."

The song "Nightmare #71" mentions silent film star Elmo Lincoln. Lincoln has a star on the Hollywood Walk of Fame at 7042 Hollywood Boulevard. Norman's Solid Rock Records office was next door at 7046 Hollywood Boulevard.

Tracks 
All songs by Larry Norman.

Original LP release

Side 1
 "Meet Me at the Airport (Fly, Fly, Fly)"
 "It's the Same Old Story"
 "Lonely By Myself"
 "Be Careful What You Sign"
 "Baroquen Spirits"

Side 2
 "Christmas Time" (original release credits Normal and Randy Stonehill as writers; Norman's re-releases only credit Norman)
 "She's a Dancer"
 "Soul Survivor"
 "Nightmare" (from original release; later releases called this song "Nightmare #71)

1980 Phydeaux reissued as Almost...So Long Ago the Garden and the MGM SinglesSide 1 "Christmastime" (rerecorded version)
 "Fly, Fly, Fly"
 "She's a Dancer"
 "It's the Same Old Story" (with rerecorded vocal)
 "Baroquen Spirits"Side 2 "Up In Canada"
 "Be Careful What You Sign"
 "Lonely By Myself"
 "Peacepollutionrevolution"
 "Nightmare" (with rerecorded vocal and slightly early fade)CD reissuesThe CDs released by Norman's companies in the 1990s and 2000s restored the original MGM vocals to "Christmastime", "Same Old Story", and "Nightmare". They also featured a severely edited version of "Baroquen Spirits". Different releases had different bonus tracks.
 "Fly, Fly, Fly"
 "It's the Same Old Story"
 "Lonely By Myself"
 "Be Careful What You Sign"
 "Baroquen Spirits"
 "Christmas Time"
 "She's a Dancer"
 "Soul Survivor"
 "Nightmare #71"Bonus tracks differ on various CD releases
 "Up in Canada" (1973 single)
 "Butterfly"
 "I Hope I'll See You in Heaven"
 "If God Is My Father" (rough mix)
 "Dear Malcolm, Dear Alwyn" (demo)
 "Soul Survivor" (alternate take with Randy Stonehill)

 "89 Words" 
In the lyrics of the surrealistic song "Nightmare," a character (specifically, a "marionette of Harpo Marx") supposedly says "exactly 89 words" to the narrator, who says "count 'em" before proceeding to quote them. In the original version of the song, however, the actual number of words is 94. The version from Almost...So Long Ago the Garden and the MGM Singles adds a further 5 words ("we sleep till he arrives"), bringing the count up to 99. Norman makes  reference to this near the end of the song "Leaving The Past Behind," from Something New Under the Son, by singing "89 is really 99."

 Personnel 
 Larry Norman – vocals, keyboards
 Bob Brady – piano
 Tony Carr – percussion
 Malcolm Duncan – saxophone
 Roger Ball – saxophone
 Rod Edwards – piano, clavinet, wurlitzer, Mini Moog, Hammond Synth
 Michael Giles – drums
 Roger Hand – percussion
 Hollywood Street Choir – vocals
 Graham Smith – harmonica
 Randy Stonehill – guitar, background vocals
 Mickey Keene – guitar
 Dave Markee – bass
 Dave Wintour – bass
  – violinProduction notes'''
 Gareth Edwards – assistant engineer
 George Martin – recording
 Bill Price – engineer
 Tony Scotti – mix down
 Tommy Vicari – mastering

See also 
 Larry Norman discography

References 

1973 albums
Larry Norman albums